Sanabal Charitable Committee, a charity front in the United Kingdom which raised money for the banned terrorist organization called the Libyan Islamic Fighting Group, which is aligned with al-Qaeda
Sanabel TV, a former locally operated television station in the West Bank city of Nablus, shut down by Israeli authorities